Darcy Russell was a rugby league footballer in the NSWRFL and was a prolific goal kicker and point-scorer.

Club career

He played in the New South Wales Rugby Football League premiership for the Eastern Suburbs for 4 seasons between 1948-1951 and  the Western Suburbs for 4 seasons between 1957 and 1960.

He played in the Wollongong competition between 1952 and 1956, and was selected for N.S.W. Country in 1953 and kicked 8 goals in the match.

Point scoring records

In the 1947 season Russell topped the point scoring lists for Easts in 1st grade and 3rd grade.

Darcy Russell was the leading pointscorer in the NSWRFL in 1957, 1959 and 1960.

He retired after the 1960 season, aged 38. His brother, Barry Russell also played for Easts in the 1950s.

References

External links
The Encyclopedia Of Rugby League; Alan Whiticker & Glen Hudson

Australian rugby league players
Western Suburbs Magpies players
Sydney Roosters players
Rugby league fullbacks
Date of birth missing
Place of birth missing